Giusvalla is a comune (municipality) in the Province of Savona in the Italian region Liguria, located about  west of Genoa and about  northwest of Savona.

Giusvalla borders the following municipalities: Cairo Montenotte, Dego, Mioglia, Pareto, Pontinvrea, and Spigno Monferrato.

Demographic evolution

Events
 first week of July : Festa al Bricco della Croce.
 second week of July : Giusvalla in Festa.
 first week of September : Festa al Mulino (loc. Mulino).
 8 September : Festa alla Cappelletta dei Prati Proia.
 21 September : Festa Patronale di S. Matteo.

References

Cities and towns in Liguria